Nikolay Skvortsov may refer to:

 Nikolay Skvortsov (swimmer), Russian swimmer
 Nikolay Skvortsov (politician), First Secretary of the Communist Party of the Kazakh SSR